The 63rd Regiment Illinois Volunteer Infantry was an infantry regiment that served in the Union Army during the American Civil War.

Service
63rd Regiment Illinois  was organized at Anna, Illinois and mustered into Federal service on April 10, 1862.

The regiment was discharged from service on July 13, 1865.

Total strength and casualties
The regiment suffered 2 officers and 66 enlisted men who were killed in action or mortally wounded and 1 officer and 137 enlisted men who died of disease, for a total of 206 fatalities.

Commanders
Colonel Francis Moro - resigned commission September 29, 1862.
Colonel Joseph B. McCowan - Mustered out with the regiment.

See also
List of Illinois Civil War Units
Illinois in the American Civil War

Notes

References
The Civil War Archive

Units and formations of the Union Army from Illinois
1862 establishments in Illinois
Military units and formations established in 1862
Military units and formations disestablished in 1865